Douglas County (county code DG) is located in the U.S. state of Kansas.  As of the 2020 census, the county population was 118,785, making it the fifth-most populous county in Kansas. Its county seat and most populous city is Lawrence.

History

Early history

For millennia, the Great Plains of North America was inhabited by nomadic Native Americans. From the 16th century to 18th century, the Kingdom of France claimed ownership of large parts of North America. In 1762, after the French and Indian War, France secretly ceded New France to Spain, per the Treaty of Fontainebleau. In 1802, Spain returned most of the land to France via the Third Treaty of San Ildefonso, although the former country kept title to about 7,500 square miles. In 1803, most of the land for modern day Kansas was acquired by the United States from France as part of the 828,000 square mile Louisiana Purchase for 2.83 cents per acre.

19th century
In 1854, the Kansas Territory was organized, then in 1861 Kansas became the 34th U.S. state. In 1855, Douglas County was established. Douglas County was opened for settlement on May 15, 1854, and was named for Stephen A. Douglas, a senator from Illinois. The county was practically at the center of the Bleeding Kansas years as leaders in Lecompton (the territorial capital) wanted Kansas to be a slave state, whereas leaders in Lawrence wanted Kansas to be a free state. The pro- and anti-slavery settlers held great animosity towards one another, leading to many events, such as the drafting of the Lecompton Constitution (which would have admitted Kansas into the Union as a slave state), the Wakarusa War (1855), the Sack of Lawrence (1856), Battle of Black Jack (1856), and the Lawrence Massacre (1863).

The first railroad in Douglas County, the Kansas Pacific, was built through that territory in 1864.

Geography

It is the fifth-smallest county in Kansas by land area. Much of its northern boundary is defined by the Kansas River, which flows through Lawrence and provides hydropower at the Bowersock Dam.

Lakes
 Clinton Lake
 Lone Star Lake

Adjacent counties
 Jefferson County (north)
 Leavenworth County (northeast)
 Johnson County (east)
 Miami County (southeast)
 Franklin County (south)
 Osage County (southwest)
 Shawnee County (northwest)

Demographics

Douglas County comprises the Lawrence, KS Metropolitan Statistical Area, which is also included in the Kansas City-Overland Park-Kansas City, MO-KS Combined Statistical Area.

As of the census of 2000, there were 99,962 people, 38,486 households, and 21,167 families residing in the county. The population density was 219 people per square mile (84/km2). There were 40,250 housing units at an average density of 88 per square mile (34/km2). The racial makeup of the county was 86.1% White, 4.2% Black or African American, 2.6% Native American, 3.1% Asian, 0.1% Pacific Islander, 1.2% from other races, and 2.7% from two or more races. Hispanic or Latino of any race were 3.3% of the population.

There were 38,486 households, out of which 27.4% had children under the age of 18 living with them, 43.1% were married couples living together, 8.5% had a female householder with no husband present, and 45.0% were non-families. 28.5% of all households were made up of individuals, and 5.8% had someone living alone who was 65 years of age or older. The average household size was 2.37 and the average family size was 2.97.

In the county, the population was spread out, with 20.4% under the age of 18, 26.4% from 18 to 24, 28.3% from 25 to 44, 16.9% from 45 to 64, and 7.9% who were 65 years of age or older. The median age was 27 years. For every 100 females there were 98.70 males. For every 100 females age 18 and over, there were 97.70 males.

The median income for a household in the county was $37,547, and the median income for a family was $53,991. Males had a median income of $35,577 versus $27,225 for females. The per capita income for the county was $19,952. About 6.2% of families and 15.9% of the population were below the poverty line, including 9.0% of those under age 18 and 7.3% of those age 65 or over.

Government

County
In recent years, since the 1990s, the Democratic Party has been dominant in Douglas County. Democrats control all County-wide offices in the county. Douglas County is currently served by county commissioners Patrick Kelly, Shannon Reid, and Karen Willey, all are Democrats. According to the Kansas Secretary of State's office, as of July 2021, there were 35,146 registered Democrats, 22,324 registered Republicans, 900 registered Libertarians, and 21,474 Independents in the county.

State
Democratic state representatives representing portions of the county include Eileen Horn (10th District), Barbara Ballard (44th District), Mike Amyx (45th District), and Dennis Highberger (46th District); Republican state representatives include Jim Karleskint (42nd District), and Ken Corbet (54th District). The three state senators representing the county, Marci Francisco (2nd District), Tom Holland (3rd District), and Anthony Hensley (19th District), are all Democrats.

Presidential elections

Douglas County has a political history more typical of Vermont and Maine than of the Great Plains. This is due to the county's strong New England roots. It voted for the Republican candidate in every Presidential election between 1864 and 1960, except in 1912 when the GOP was mortally divided and the county supported Progressive Theodore Roosevelt. Roosevelt would later rejoin the GOP. The county reverted to form and gave Republican presidential nominees over 60 percent of the vote in every election between 1920 and 1960 (except 1932 when Herbert Hoover received 58.7 percent). As a measure of how deeply the county's Republican roots ran, it was one of the few counties where Franklin D. Roosevelt was shut out in all four of his successful campaigns. Even when Kansas was swept up in FDR's landslide victories of 1932 and 1936, Republican candidates carried the county easily; FDR actually lost ground in 1936 compared to 1932.

This tradition was broken in 1964, when the conservative sentiment and Western origins of Barry Goldwater drove the county into Lyndon B. Johnson's hands, making Johnson the first Democrat ever to carry the county. Even then, however, Goldwater managed 45 percent of the county's vote. With more moderate GOP candidates, the GOP carried the county in every election between 1968 and 1988. During this time, Jimmy Carter in 1976 and Michael Dukakis in 1988 were the only Democrats to come reasonably close to carrying the county.

However, the growing transformation of Lawrence into a liberal academic center has pulled the county into the Democratic column in every election since 1992. This was typical of many counties around the country dominated by college towns. In 2004, John Kerry became only the second Democrat to win a majority of the county's vote. Since then, Douglas County has been one of the most Democratic counties in Kansas. In 2016 and 2020, for instance, Donald Trump turned in the worst showings on record for a Republican in the county without the presence of a credible third-party challenger on the ballot. In most elections since the turn of the millennium, only Wyandotte County has been more Democratic. In the 2018 governor's race, however, Douglas County was Democratic nominee Laura Kelly's strongest county.

Since the 1990s, Douglas and Wyandotte have frequently been the only two counties in the state to vote for Democratic presidential candidates although that has changed as of 2020.

Laws
The county overwhelmingly voted "No" on the 2022 Kansas Value Them Both Amendment, an anti-abortion ballot measure, by 81% to 19%, outpacing its support of Joe Biden during the 2020 presidential election.

Law enforcement
The Douglas County Sheriff's office has two divisions, Corrections, which operates a 185-bed jail, and Operations. The Operations Division includes a dive team, a patrol, and a warrants unit. The department works with other local police agencies at the University of Kansas, Lawrence Police Department (Kansas), Eudora, and Baldwin City.  the sheriff is Jay T. Armbrister.

Education

Unified school districts
Douglas County is served by seven school districts.
 Lawrence USD 497 serves Lawrence, the Clinton Lake area, and parts of rural Douglas County that surround Lawrence.
 Baldwin City USD 348 serves Baldwin City and most of southern Douglas County.
 Perry-Lecompton USD 343 serves Lecompton and most of northwest Douglas County.
 Eudora USD 491 serves Eudora and the northeast part of the county.
 Santa Fe Trail USD 434 An Osage County school that covers the far southwest part of the county.
 Wellsville USD 289 covers extreme southeast Douglas County.
 Shawnee Heights USD 450 services the extreme western part of the county including Big Springs.

Universities and colleges
The University of Kansas's main campus is located in Lawrence, as is Haskell Indian Nations University.  Baker University, the state's oldest university, is located in Baldwin City.

Parks
Clinton Lake, completed in 1980, offers boating, fishing and other water sports and various parks surrounding the lake provides camping and trails for mountain biking, hiking and horseback riding.

Lone Star Lake is a small country lake to the southwest of Lawrence offers fishing, boating and camping.  Just northeast of Baldwin City is Douglas State Fishing Lake which provides hunting, fishing and limited camping.  Other parks around the county include Black Jack Park which includes the Ivan Boyd Prairie Preserve and Robert Hall Pearson Memorial Park, Broken Arrow Park in Lawrence and Wells Overlook Park just south of Lawrence.

Events
Major events in the county include the Maple Leaf Festival in Baldwin City every third full weekend in October. Lecompton's Territorial Days take place every year in June and Lawrence has many parades throughout the year including Christmas and St. Patrick's Day.

Transportation

Major highways
 , runs east to west just north of Lawrence.
  runs north to south through the middle of the county and the middle of Lawrence.
  virtually follows the Oregon Trail heading west out of Lawrence.
  runs east to west in the southern half of the county, going through Baldwin City and skirts the Santa Fe Trail.
  runs from the I-70 Lecompton Exchange along the south and west border of Lawrence to US-59 then north until 23rd Street where it heads east out of town into Johnson County.

Other major highways include:  
 which is in Grant township leading from Leavenworth to Jefferson County. 
 starts just outside Lawrence and leads into Leavenworth County.
 is in extreme southeast Douglas County and leads into Franklin County.

County Highways

Douglas County also maintains an extensive network of county highways to serve the rural areas of the county. None of these county highways is in the Lawrence city limits.

Communities

Incorporated cities
 Baldwin City
 Eudora
 Lawrence
 Lecompton

Unincorporated communities

 Big Springs
 Black Jack
 Clearfield
 Clinton
 Globe
 Grover
 Hesper
 Kanwaka
 Lake View
 Lone Star
 Midland
 Pleasant Grove
 Sibleyville
 Stull
 Vinland
 Worden

Townships
Douglas County is divided into nine townships. The city of Lawrence is considered governmentally independent and is excluded from the census figures for the townships. In the following table, the population center is the largest city (or cities) of significant size included in that township's population total.

Historic townships
The county originally had only four townships. Lecompton comprised the area of Lecompton, Kanwaka, and Clinton townships; Washington took the place of Marion and Willow Springs townships; Wakarusa comprised both Wakarusa and Eudora townships; and Calhoun was the original name of Palmyra township. Grant township was annexed from Jefferson County in 1874.

Notable people

 Isaac F. Hughes, Douglas County commissioner and City Council member in both Lawrence, Kansas, and Los Angeles, California.

See also
 National Register of Historic Places listings in Douglas County, Kansas
 Kansas River - Natural crossing point for westward wagon trains on the Oregon Trail
 California Road - Cutoff on the Oregon Trail to Lawrence, Kansas from Westport
 Santa Fe Trail Swales - Visible near Black Jack Park
 Geographic Information System Viewers

References

Further reading

 Nowak, David. J. Assessing Urban Forest Effects and Values, Douglas County, Kansas. Newtown Square, PA: United States Forest Service, Northern Research Station, 2014.
 Armitage, Katie H., “‘Seeking a Home Where He Himself Is Free’: African Americans Build a Community in Douglas County, Kansas,” Kansas History, 31 (Autumn 2008), 154–75
 Standard Atlas of Douglas County, Kansas; Geo. A. Ogle & Co; 53 pages; 1921.
 Plat Book and Complete Survey of Douglas County, Kansas; Kenyon Co; 44 pages; 1909.
 Standard Atlas of Douglas County, Kansas; Geo. A. Ogle & Co; 43 pages; 1902.
 Standard Atlas of Douglas County, Kansas; F.W. Beers & Co; 25 pages; 1873.

External links

County
 
 Douglas County - Directory of Public Officials
 Douglas County - Law Library

Other
 Aerial Photography from Multiple Decades
 Daily World, Google news archive. —PDFs for 1,062 issues, dating from 1892 through 1895.
 Daily Record, Google news archive. —PDFs for 998 issues, dating from 1889 through 1893.

Maps
 Douglas County maps: Current, Historic, KDOT
 Kansas highway maps: Current, Historic, KDOT
 Kansas railroad maps: Current, 1996, 1915, KDOT and Kansas Historical Society

 
Kansas counties
1855 establishments in Kansas Territory
States and territories established in 1855